Lahi may refer to:

Riho Lahi (1904–1995), Estonian writer and journalist
Lahi, Papua New Guinea

See also
 Lehi (disambiguation)